USS Elizabeth M. Froelich (SP-380) was a minesweeper that served in the United States Navy from 1917 to 1919.
 
Elizabeth M. Froelich was built as a commercial freight boat of the same name. On 18 May 1917, the U.S. Navy acquired her at New York City from her owner for use on the section patrol as a minesweeper during World War I. She was commissioned as USS Elizabeth M. Froelich (SP-380) the same day.

After fitting out as a minesweeper, Elizabeth M. Froelich was assigned to the 5th Naval District, where she operated for the rest of World War I and into 1919. She was decommissioned and returned to her owner on the same day in 1919; sources differ as to whether the day was 14 April 1919 or 14 May 1919.

Notes

References

NavSource Online: Section Patrol Craft Photo Archive: Elizabeth M. Froelich (SP 380)

Minesweepers of the United States Navy
World War I minesweepers of the United States
1900s ships